Friends of Fahey Tribute is a tribute album to guitarist John Fahey released in 2006.

History
The Friends of Fahey Tribute project was produced by Tinh, a friend and student of John Fahey. All the performers were either friends, students or fellow-musicians influenced by Fahey's music and career.

All the performers donated their proceeds to the non-profit Village School Foundation in Viet Nam.

Reception

In his Allmusic review, critic Alex Henderson stated "This is a worthy tribute to an unjustly neglected giant of American music." and singled out the two tracks by Vietnamese guitarist Tinh as the album's most lovely. Erik Davis of Minor 7th praised the album, writing "All the players here do justice to the musical legacy of a man who still lives through the music he gave life to."

Track listing

References

External links
Slackertone Records entry
Rambles magazine entry

2006 compilation albums
John Fahey (musician) tribute albums